Jack Brooks (14 February 1912 – 8 November 1971) was an English-American lyricist.

Brooks was born in Liverpool, England. His family was Jewish and originally from Russia, having changed their surname to Brooks from Bruch. He wrote lyrics of many popular songs, including "Ole Buttermilk Sky" (with Hoagy Carmichael) "That's Amore" (with Harry Warren) and "(Roll Along) Wagon Train" (with Sammy Fain) the second theme used on the television program, Wagon Train. He joined the American Society of Composers, Authors and Publishers (ASCAP) in 1946.

"Ole Buttermilk Sky" was written for the 1946 film Canyon Passage, and was sung by Carmichael in the movie. It was nominated for an Academy Award for Best Original Song. It became a big hit for Kay Kyser that year.

"That's Amore" first appeared in the 1953 film The Caddy where it was sung by Dean Martin. The song was nominated for an Academy Award for Best Original Song in 1953. It was a signature song for Martin for decades. Music critic Joe Queenan has described the song as "A charming, if goofy, parody of popular Neapolitan organ-grinder music".

Brooks also wrote the lyrics for many songs in movies, such as "Let Me Be a People" and "Turn It On" in comedian Jerry Lewis' film, Cinderfella (1960).

He died in Los Angeles, California.

References

External links

1912 births
1971 deaths
Musicians from Liverpool
English songwriters
English lyricists
British emigrants to the United States
Burials at Hollywood Forever Cemetery
20th-century English musicians